Prunus pulgarensis is a species of plant in the family Rosaceae. It is endemic to the Philippines.  It is threatened by habitat loss.

References

Sources

Flora of the Philippines
pulgarensis
Endangered plants
Taxonomy articles created by Polbot